Heidelberg is a city of 150,000 in southwestern Germany.

Heidelberg may also refer to:

Places
Europe
Heidelberg, Taurida Governorate, Ukraine (now Novohorivka, Tokmak)

Oceania
Heidelberg, Victoria, Australia
Heidelberg, New Zealand, a suburb of Invercargill

Africa
Heidelberg, Gauteng, South Africa
Heidelberg, Western Cape, South Africa

North America
Heidelberg, Ontario, Canada
Heidelberg, Kentucky, USA
Heidelberg, Minnesota, USA
Heidelberg, Mississippi, USA
Heidelberg, Pennsylvania, USA
Heidelberg Township, Berks County, Pennsylvania, USA
Lower Heidelberg Township, Berks County, Pennsylvania, USA
North Heidelberg Township, Berks County, Pennsylvania, USA
South Heidelberg Township, Berks County, Pennsylvania, USA
Heidelberg Township, Lebanon County, Pennsylvania, USA
Heidelberg Township, Lehigh County, Pennsylvania, USA
Heidelberg Township, York County, Pennsylvania, USA
Heidelberg, Texas, USA
Heidelberg Street, a neighborhood in Detroit, Michigan, USA

Education
Heidelberg University, Germany
Heidelberg University (Ohio), United States
Heidelberg Center for Latin America, European-affiliated university in Chile
Colegio Heidelberg, Gran Canaria, Spain
Heidelberg Centre - School of Graphic Communications Management, Toronto, Canada

Other uses
 Heidelberg strain of salmonella
Heidelberg School, the Australian art movement
Heidelberg Appeal, 1992 scientific manifesto
Heidelberg Project by Tyree Guyton in Detroit, Michigan
HeidelbergCement, a cement and building materials company
Heidelberg, brand name of Heidelberger Druckmaschinen printing presses
Heidelberg, codename for the third release of Fedora Core, a Linux distribution
Heidelberg Catechism
Heidelberg Tun
Heidelberg Disputation
 Heidelberg Tavern massacre, Cape Town, South Africa
Heidelberg (electoral district)

See also
Homo heidelbergensis